The Czech Republic is a nation state in Central Europe bordered by Germany to the west, Austria to the south, Slovakia to the east and Poland to the northeast. It is a unitary parliamentary republic, has 10.5 million inhabitants and the capital and largest city is Prague, with over 1.2 million residents.
 
The Czech Republic joined NATO in 1999 and the European Union in 2004; it is a member of the United Nations, the OECD, the OSCE, and the Council of Europe. It is a developed country with an advanced, high income economy and high living standards. The UNDP ranks the country 14th in inequality-adjusted human development. The Czech Republic also ranks as the 6th most peaceful country, while achieving strong performance in democratic governance. It has the lowest unemployment rate in the European Union.

For further information on the types of business entities in this country and their abbreviations, see "Business entities in the Czech Republic".

Largest by revenue 
This is a list of companies based in the Czech Republic by revenue. The list is limited to companies with annual revenues exceeding 100 billion CZK. Revenue, assets and net income are shown in CZK billions.

Notable firms 
This list includes notable companies with primary headquarters located in the country. The industry and sector follow the Industry Classification Benchmark taxonomy. Organizations which have ceased operations are included and noted as defunct.

See also 
 Economy of the Czech Republic
 List of banks in the Czech Republic
 List of supermarket chains in the Czech Republic

References 

Czech Republic